Bye-Bye BoxBoy! is a puzzle-platform game developed by HAL Laboratory and published by Nintendo for the Nintendo 3DS handheld console. The game was released worldwide in 2017, and is a follow-up to BoxBoy! (2015) and BoxBoxBoy! (2016).

Development 
Bye-Bye BoxBoy! was developed by HAL Laboratory, the developers of the previous games as well as the Kirby series. The game was released for the Nintendo 3DS in April 12, 2017 in North America, with a demo being available the same day.

Reception

Bye-Bye BoxBoy! received "generally favourable" reviews from professional critics according to review aggregator website Metacritic. It won the award for "Best Puzzle Game" at Game Informers Best of 2017 Awards, while it came in last place for "Best Mobile/Handheld Game" in their Reader's Choice Best of 2017 Awards.

References

2017 video games
HAL Laboratory games
Nintendo 3DS games
Nintendo 3DS-only games
Puzzle-platform games
Single-player video games
Video games developed in Japan
Video games that use Amiibo figurines
BoxBoy!